Marc Pos ('s-Hertogenbosch, 24 October 1968) is a Dutch creative entrepreneur, writer, director, producer and maker of television, video, events and advertising. With his work, he three times won the New York Festivals TV & Film Awards, for The Secret of a Master Painter (2016), a documentary about Lang Lang (2017), and The New Stradivarius (2018). De Lama's won the Dutch Emmy's in 2006 (the Gouden Televizier-Ring). In 2021 Pos was awarded the Dutch Directors Guild Award for his contributions as director of the opening, intermezzos and acts during the Eurovision Song Contest 2021. With The Traitors, Pos won the C21 Best World Format in 2021 and the Rose d'Or in 2022.

Producer 
Pos founded POSVIDEO in 2015. Here he develops owned formats such as The Secret of a Master Painter (with the special The Secret of the Night Watch), Historical Evidence and the investigative journalist program Worth of the Earth. Psychological entertainment program The Traitors was sold in over 20 countries, among which the BBC's The Traitors and NBC's The Traitors. Since November 2020, POSVIDEO works in a partnership with All3Media production house IDTV, where he became CEO in 2021.

References

External links
Official website

1968 births
Living people
21st-century Dutch businesspeople